Newman's Airport  is a privately owned, public airport located 7 mi (11.3 km) west of Kalamazoo, Michigan, United States. It is a choice for many pilots in the area who wish to avoid the Kalamazoo-Battle Creek International Airport. Newman's is an airpark community consisting of 13 homes each with private hangars. The airport offers tie-downs and hangars.

On average, 96 aircraft operations occur per week, with 90% being local general aviation. No commercial airlines service Newman's. 20 aircraft are based on the field.

History 
Newman's Airport is named after Howard "Budd" Newman. He built the airport after moving from Detroit to the Kalamazoo area. After working multiple welding jobs he decided to open his own welding shop and incorporate his other passion, flying. He built the first east/west runway, now a taxiway, in the early 1950s and began utilizing it to fly parts in and out of his shop. Over the next 40 plus years, Newman slowly purchased more land allowing for the north/south runway, the current runway, to be built.

In 1998, the airfield and surrounding land was sold, and in 1999 was subdivided to create the Skyview Estates community. There are currently 13 homes surrounding the airstrip, each with a private hangar with runway access.

Events 
Every August there is an annual fly-in breakfast. This brings upwards of 100 planes and several hundred people in attendance.

References

External links

Airports in Michigan
Buildings and structures in Kalamazoo County, Michigan
Transportation in Kalamazoo County, Michigan